Samikshya Adhikari is a female Nepalese Female singer. Adhikari rose to prominence as a singer following the release of her song "Balapan Ko Umer" from the Nepali movie "Nai Nabhannu La 4."

Controversy
Adhikari accused Nepali actor of rape and filed a case against him.

Awards
Won: Nepal Music & Fashion Award
Won: Nepal Best Music Award 2021

References

Living people
People from Pokhara
Nepalese playback singers
2005 births